Lai Kin Hong is the President of the Tribunal de Segunda Instancia, an appellate court within the judiciary of Macau.

Mr. Justice Lai is also a member of the Conselho dos Magistrados Judiciais.

References

Macau judges
Government of Macau
Living people
Year of birth missing (living people)